James Logan Elementary School is a historic elementary school building in the Logan neighborhood of Philadelphia, Pennsylvania. It is part of the School District of Philadelphia. The building was designed by Irwin T. Catharine and built in 1923–1924. It is a three-story, nine-bay, "U"-shaped brick building with a raised basement in the Colonial Revival-style. It features a central entrance pavilion, round arched surrounds, and a brick parapet.

It was added to the National Register of Historic Places in 1988 as the Logan Demonstration School.

References

External links

School buildings on the National Register of Historic Places in Philadelphia
Colonial Revival architecture in Pennsylvania
Gothic Revival architecture in Pennsylvania
School buildings completed in 1924
Logan, Philadelphia
Elementary schools in Philadelphia
School District of Philadelphia
1924 establishments in Pennsylvania